Lalit Kishore Chaturvedi (2 August 1931 – 5 April 2015) was an Indian politician who was a Bharatiya Janata Party (BJP) leader in Rajasthan. He was a member of the Rajya Sabha. He was cabinet minister in earlier state BJP ministries with responsibilities of important portfolios.
He was earlier state president of Bharatiya Janata Party, Rajasthan (1988 & 2003).
He had a Master of Science degree in physics.

References

External links
 Parliament of India member homepage

Rajya Sabha members from Rajasthan
1931 births
2015 deaths
Indians imprisoned during the Emergency (India)
Bharatiya Janata Party politicians from Rajasthan
Rajya Sabha members from the Bharatiya Janata Party